Andro Michel (born June 11, 1990) is a Swedish  professional ice hockey goaltender. He played with Färjestads BK in the Elitserien during the 2010–11 Elitserien season.

References

External links

1990 births
Färjestad BK players
Living people
Swedish ice hockey goaltenders
Ice hockey people from Gothenburg